EVTA may mean
 Endovenous thermal ablation
 European Voice Teachers Association, a member organisation of the European Music Council
 Tukums Airport, now Jūrmala Airport (EVJA)